Brad De Losa (born 1979) is an Australian fitter who is a champion at forestry sports such as wood-chopping and sawing.  In 2015, he set a new world record, cutting through four tree trunks in less than 58 seconds. In May 2017 Brad De Losa managed to win the Stihl Timbersports Champions Trophy for a third year in a row.

De Losa won his first competition at the age of 16.

References

External links
Profile, braddelosa.com.au; accessed 27 May 2015. 

1979 births 
Living people
Date of birth missing (living people)
Place of birth missing (living people)
Australian woodchoppers